OL Reign is an American professional women's soccer team based in Seattle, Washington. Founded by Bill and Teresa Predmore in 2012 as Seattle Reign FC, it was one of eight inaugural members of the National Women's Soccer League (NWSL). In 2020, OL Groupe, the parent company of French clubs Olympique Lyonnais and Olympique Lyonnais Féminin, became the team's majority owner and rebranded to its current name, badge, and colors. Laura Harvey is the team's head coach; she led the team to two consecutive NWSL Shield wins in 2014 and 2015 and a third in 2022.

OL Reign has played its home matches at Lumen Field since 2022. The team previously played at Starfire Sports Complex in Tukwila (2013), at Memorial Stadium (2014–18), and at Cheney Stadium in Tacoma (2019–21).

History

Establishment 

Following the demise of Women's Professional Soccer in April 2012, the United States Soccer Federation announced in June that it would found a new professional women's soccer league (later named National Women's Soccer League) and invite prospective team owners to submit applications. Bill Predmore, founder and CEO of Seattle-based digital marketing agency, POP, submitted his application pitch for a team tentatively named Seattle Sirens FC. In November 2012, it was confirmed that Predmore's application had been accepted and there would be a Seattle-based women's professional soccer team in 2013. On December 19, 2012, the team name was unveiled as Seattle Reign FC, named in honor of the 1990s Seattle Reign women's basketball team. Former general manager of the Seattle Sounders Women and Seattle Sounders FC's director of youth programs Amy Carnell was named general manager.

2013: Inaugural season 

On December 21, 2012, the team announced Laura Harvey as its first head coach. Harvey was head coach of Arsenal L.F.C. from 2010–2012 after serving as an assistant for two years, assisted and then coached Birmingham City L.F.C. from 2002–2008, and served as an assistant coach for England's U-17, U-19 and U-23 women's national teams from 2005–2011. Before the regular season, Harvey took over as general manager after Amy Carnell resigned.

On January 11, 2013, Kaylyn Kyle, Teresa Noyola, Megan Rapinoe, Amy Rodriguez, Jenny Ruiz, Hope Solo, and Emily Zurrer were named to the team as part of the NWSL Player Allocation. On January 18, the Reign selected Christine Nairn, Mallory Schaffer, Kristen Meier, and Haley Kopmeyer at the 2013 NWSL College Draft. On February 4, 2013, it was announced that the team had signed four free agents: Kate Deines, Jess Fishlock, Tiffany Cameron, and Lindsay Taylor. During the 2013 NWSL Supplemental Draft, the team selected Nikki Krzysik, Lauren Barnes, Laura Heyboer, Liz Bogus, Michelle Betos and Kaley Fountain.

Leading into the preseason, it was learned that the Reign would be without all of their American allocated players for almost half of the season. Amy Rodriguez announced she was pregnant with her first child and would not be playing during the inaugural season. Hope Solo would be away for the first part of the season after recovering from wrist surgery and Megan Rapinoe had already signed with French club Olympique Lyonnais from January to June and would miss at least nine games. After traveling to Japan in the preseason to play matches against defending L. League champion INAC Kobe Leonessa, Fukuoka J. Anclas, and Nojima Stella Kanagawa, the Reign faced their first regular season match against the Chicago Red Stars at Benedictine University, in which Seattle's first college draft pick Christine Nairn scored the Reign's first goal of the season via a header off an assist from Liz Bogus. The point that Seattle earned in the game would be its only for the next nine games.

In June 2013, head coach Laura Harvey began making some trades and signing new international players. With the trades and the return of Solo and Rapinoe, the Reign began to turn the season around with a 1–1 tie against the Western New York Flash. The game would be the first of a six-game undefeated streak for the Reign with two ties and four wins. After losing to regional rival Portland Thorns FC 2–1 in the season finale in front of a sold-out crowd of 3,855, the Reign ended the 2013 NWSL season seventh in the league with a 5–14–3 record.

2014–18: Seattle years

2014 season 

During the 2014 season, the Reign set a league record unbeaten streak of 16 games. During the 16-game stretch, the Reign compiled a 13–0–3 record. The streak came to an end July 12, 2014, in a match against the Chicago Red Stars that ended 1–0 in favor of the Red Stars. The team finished first in the regular season clinching the NWSL Shield for the first time. After defeating the Washington Spirit 2–1 in the playoff semifinals, the Reign was defeated 2–1 by FC Kansas City during the championship final. Following the regular season, the team earned several league awards. Kim Little won the Golden Boot and Most Valuable Player awards; Laura Harvey was named Coach of the Year; Kendall Fletcher, Jess Fishlock, Little and Nahomi Kawasumi were named to the NWSL Best XI team while goalkeeper Hope Solo and defenders Lauren Barnes and Stephanie Cox were named to the Second XI team.

2015 season 

The Reign finished the 2015 season in first place clinching the NWSL Shield for the second consecutive time. After defeating the Washington Spirit 3–0 in a playoff semifinal, the Reign was defeated 1–0 by FC Kansas City during the championship final in Portland. Following the regular season, the team earned several league award nominations.  Kim Little, Jess Fishlock, and Bev Yanez were nominated for league Most Valuable Player, Laura Harvey was nominated for Coach of the Year; and Lauren Barnes and Kendall Fletcher were nominated for Defender of the Year.

Laura Harvey was ultimately named Coach of the Year for a second consecutive year. Barnes, Little, Yanez, and Fishlock were named to the NWSL Best XI team while Kendall Fletcher, Stephanie Cox, Megan Rapinoe, and Keelin Winters were named to the Second XI team.

2016 season 

The Reign finished the 2016 season in fifth place with a  record, narrowly missing a playoff spot by two points. The season was complicated by a number of players being unavailable during the early part of the season due to injury including Manon Melis, Jess Fishlock and Megan Rapinoe. In early July, Nahomi Kawasumi returned to the Reign for the first time since the 2014 season and scored a brace in her first match with the team. Rachel Corsie and Haley Kopmeyer suffered injuries during a match in July against the Western New York Flash that was controversially played on a baseball field. Schedule changes from previous years were announced in February that resulted in an imbalance amongst team matchups.

In late August, the Reign announced that Hope Solo was taking a leave of absence for the remainder of the season after being suspended from the U.S. national team. In September, four-year team captain Keelin Winters announced her retirement for the end of the season. On October 17, midfielder Kim Little announced that she would leave the Reign and return to Arsenal. Harvey said Little was given an "incredible offer" of a multi-year contract, though no other details were disclosed.

2017 season 

Following the loss of core players Kim Little and Keelin Winters following the 2016 season, the Reign faced a bit of re-structuring for the 2017 season. Three 2017 NWSL College Draft rookies were signed including defender Maddie Bauer, forward Katie Johnson, and midfielder Kristen McNabb. With Kim Little moving back to Arsenal, the Reign re-signed attacking midfielder Christine Nairn, who had played for the team during its inaugural season. The team also signed Canadian international Diana Matheson and Australian international Larissa Crummer, though they spent the majority of the season injured, as well as New Zealand international defender Rebekah Stott. The Reign finished in fifth place for the second consecutive season narrowly missing a playoff spot after losing 1–0 to Kansas City. Megan Rapinoe was the team's leading scorer (and league's third highest) with 12 goals. Her season performance contributed to her nomination as FIFA World Player of the Year the following year.

2018 season 

After two consecutive seasons of fifth-place finishes and thus outside of the playoffs, head coach and general manager Laura Harvey stepped down and was replaced by former rival Vlatko Andonovski as new head coach of the team. The amicable transition nonetheless led to new vision for the team and new players, with Andonovski bringing in 11 new players on the season-opening roster. Notably, Andonovski traded for US international Allie Long and Australian international Steph Catley, while English international Jodie Taylor and Danish international Theresa Nielsen joined on free transfers from abroad. The refreshed team performed well throughout the season and remained largely in second place behind a dominant North Carolina Courage team, until a loss to Cascadia rival Portland Thorns FC at the end of the regular season dropped it to third place. This set up a semi-final rematch with the Thorns FC away from home, which the team lost 2–1. Despite the late slide, Andonovski led the team back to the playoffs for the first time since 2015 in his first season in charge.

2019–2021: Relocation to Tacoma 
On January 30, 2019, the team announced that it would relocate to Cheney Stadium in Tacoma for the 2019 season and re-brand itself as Reign FC. This relocation, as well as two new minority ownership groups (Mikal Thomsen, owner of the Tacoma Rainiers and Adrian Hanauer, owner of the Seattle Sounders FC, as well as his mother, philanthropist Lenore Hanauer), secured the team's long-term future by addressing long-standing stadium issues. A new soccer-specific 5,000 capacity stadium that would host Reign and Tacoma Defiance games was planned adjacent to Cheney Stadium.

2019 season 

In their first season playing in Tacoma, the Reign finished 4th in the regular season, to qualify for the NWSL Playoffs but were knocked out by the North Carolina Courage in the semi-final.

2020 season 

Due to the COVID-19 pandemic, the regular season was cancelled in 2020. Instead, the newly renamed OL Reign took part in the 2020 NWSL Challenge Cup and the NWSL Fall Series.

2021 season 

Head coach Farid Benstiti resigned in July for undisclosed reasons; a joint investigation by the league and the players' association in December 2022 found that he abused players by "weight-shaming" them. OL Reign finished 2nd in the regular season, led first by interim coach Sam Laity and then by Laura Harvey after her return. They fell once again in the semi-final, this time to the eventual champions Washington Spirit.

2022: Return to Seattle 

Due to increased costs and lengthier timeline, the Tacoma stadium plan fell out of favor. Thus, iIt was announced in December 2021 that the Reign would be returning to Seattle with Lumen Field as their new home stadium while continuing to train and operate out of Tacoma. In the Challenge Cup, the Reign finished first in the West Division and earned the top seed overall but lost in the semifinal against the Washington Spirit in a penalty shoot-out. The team also won the mid-season invitational Women's Cup final against Louisville. In their final regular-season match, the Reign won the 2022 NWSL Shield, the team's third.

Beginning in February 2023, Starfire Sports will become the Reign's training facility. The club will become Starfire's main tenant and operate out of there in 2024, after Seattle Sounders FC moves to their own facility.

Colors and badge 

On December 19, 2012, the team's name was unveiled as Seattle Reign FC. The team's colors were announced as white, platinum, royal blue and midnight black along with a neon green away colors The name was selected in part as homage to the first professional women's sports team in Seattle, the Seattle Reign, a defunct professional basketball team in the American Basketball League. That team was in turn named after its location in King County, and as a pun alluding to Seattle's rainy climate. In conjunction with the colors, the team also released its primary and alternate badges: the primary badge features a queen wearing a platinum crown (in a reference to the team name), while the alternate badge is monochrome and foregrounds the crown itself.

Owner Bill Predmore stated, "Today's announcement is the result of a thoughtful process to identify the name that best represents the values of our club, articulates our long-term ambitions and celebrates the community within which our supporters live. Reign FC meets all of those objectives and at the same time honors the legacy of professional women's sports in Seattle. Like the Seattle Sounders, whose fans selected a name that honored those who pioneered the sport of soccer in Seattle in the early 1970s, Seattle Reign FC was, in part, selected to pay homage those visionaries – the leaders and players of the Seattle Reign women's basketball team – who pioneered professional women's sports in Seattle."

On January 30, 2019, it was announced that the team would relocate to Tacoma, Washington and rename as simply Reign FC. As part of the rebrand, the team released a slightly modified visual identity and a new primary team badge that removed the word "Seattle" from the original badge.

Following the acquisition of the team by OL Groupe in January 2020, the team announced another rebrand on March 6, 2020, as OL Reign, with new primary colors of blue, white, and gold to match those from Olympique Lyonnais and a new team badge that includes the lion as a symbol for Lyon.

Sponsorship 
In April 2013, Moda Health was announced as the team's jersey sponsor. The company remained the jersey sponsor for the 2014 and 2015 seasons. In 2016, Microsoft was named as the new jersey sponsor and "presenting partner". The team also uses Microsoft technology on and off the pitch as part of the partnership.

In January 2019, Seattle-based online retailer Zulily was announced as the team's new presenting partner and third-ever jersey sponsor. On the same day, Seattle Sounders FC also announced Zulily as its new jersey partner, making it the first time that both men's and women's professional soccer teams in Seattle share the same jersey sponsor and Seattle only the second-ever American city to hold this distinction. Despite the new jersey sponsor, Microsoft remains the team's technology partner and will continue to provide sports analytics to the coaching staff. During an unveiling event for the new secondary jersey in April 2019, aerospace corporation Boeing was announced as a kit sponsor for a slot on the back of both jerseys. The jersey partnership with Zulily concluded after the 2020 season.

Heading into the 2021 season, OL Reign elected to feature the Black Future Co-op Fund on the front of their jerseys until a new presenting sponsor is secured. At the start of the 2022 regular season, Tacoma-based healthcare group MultiCare Health System was announced as a back-of-kit sponsor alongside the existing jersey sponsors Black Future Co-op Fund and Boeing.

Stadium 

During the inaugural season of the NWSL, Reign FC played at Starfire Stadium in Tukwila, Washington. The stadium is located approximately 12 miles from downtown Seattle and is the training facility for Seattle Sounders FC, as well as where the Sounders play their U.S. Open Cup matches. With a seating capacity for 4,500 spectators, the stadium also features a press box with full scoreboard and sound system capabilities. The pitch features FieldTurf.

In February 2014, it was announced that the team would be moving to Memorial Stadium, located at the Seattle Center, for at least the 2014 and 2015 seasons; the Reign chose to remain there beyond the originally intended two seasons. The stadium features an artificial turf pitch that was installed in 2013 and a seating capacity of 12,000 spectators, although seating capacity was set at 6,000 for the beginning of the 2014 season. The stadium was the previous home of the Seattle Sounders from 1974–1975 when the team played in the North American Soccer League (NASL) and from 1995 to 2002 when the new incarnation of the team played in the A-League.

In late 2017, the team's future in Seattle beyond 2018 was seen as uncertain due to issues with Memorial Stadium. The facility does not meet league standards for playing surfaces set to be enforced in 2019. Additionally, the stadium is owned by the Seattle School District, which has announced plans to build a new high school in that area of the city, with the stadium being the most likely site. The Reign were seen by national soccer media as lacking viable options for a replacement—other possible venues in the region are problematic due to size, location, or ancillary facilities. Reign FC owner Bill Predmore initially responded that, despite these challenges, the team would remain at Memorial Stadium for 2019. However, newly enforced standards by U.S. Soccer and NWSL made this untenable, and the team relocated to Tacoma, Washington in January 2019. Reign planned to play temporarily at Cheney Stadium before moving to a soccer-specific stadium shared with Tacoma Defiance when construction is completed. The new venue was originally set to open in 2021, but has since been delayed indefinitely due to feasibility issues caused by the COVID–19 pandemic.

In December 2021, OL Reign announced that Lumen Field will become its home stadium beginning in 2022. Lumen Field has a capacity of 68,740; standard configuration for Reign games seats 10,000 but can expand based on demand for individual games. With the move back to Seattle, the team also exited the planned soccer-specific stadium project in Tacoma.

Broadcasting 

From 2013 to 2016, Seattle Reign games were streamed live by Bootstrapper Studios via YouTube. The broadcasts were called by KOMO News Radio Sports Director, Tom Glasgow, with color commentary provided by Lesle Gallimore, head coach of the Washington Huskies. During the 2013 season, a select number of league games were broadcast on Fox Sports. During the 2014 season, several league games were broadcast by ESPN.

In March 2015, the team became one of the first sports teams to use the newly released app Periscope to stream a preseason friendly against the Portland Pilots. In 2015, six select regular season games and the playoff matches were broadcast by Fox Soccer. The playoff final featuring Reign FC and FC Kansas City set what was then a league record, averaging 167,000 viewers on Fox Sports 1 – an increase of 7 percent compared to the 2014 final broadcast on ESPN2. That record stood until the 2016 NWSL finals between Western New York and Washington, which averaged more than 180,000 viewers.

As of 2017, Reign games are streamed exclusively by Go90 for American audiences and via the NWSL website for international viewers. As part of a three-year agreement with A&E Networks, Lifetime broadcasts one NWSL Game of the Week on Saturday afternoons. For the 2017 season, the Reign were featured in nationally televised Lifetime NWSL Game of the Week broadcasts on May 27, July 8, August 26, and September 9, 2017. During the 2018 season, Lifetime match broadcasts featuring Seattle include May 5, July 21, and August 11, 2018.

Supporters 
The first supporters group formed for the Reign is the Royal Guard. Founded by Matt Banks and Kiana Coleman in April 2013, the group became the first organized supporters group for a women's professional sports team in Washington state's history. Other supporters groups for the team have included Fortune's Favourites and Queen Anne Collective.

Rivalries 

Like the Seattle Sounders FC rivalry with the Portland Timbers, the Reign has a long-standing regional rivalry with Portland Thorns FC. In May 2015, a match between the two teams in Portland set a new attendance record with 21,144 fans cheering in the stadium. Their August 29, 2021, meeting was played at Lumen Field in Seattle as part of a doubleheader with the Sounders and Timbers, drawing 27,248 spectators to break the league's attendance record.

After losing twice to FC Kansas City during the NWSL championship final in 2014 and 2015 despite winning first place in the league, the Reign also considered FC Kansas City to be a rival. However, Kansas City folded after the 2017 season, with their head coach Vlatko Andonovski joining the Reign.

An expansion team returned to the Kansas City area in 2021, and the rivalry was revived in 2022 when the Kansas City Current won the playoff semifinal in front of a record-breaking crowd of 21,491 in Seattle. A team from Kansas City has eliminated the Reign in the playoffs in all three of the club's Shield-winning seasons.

Ownership and management 
OL Reign was wholly owned by Bill and Teresa Predmore from its establishment until January 2019. Bill Predmore was a co-founder and the CEO of POP, a Seattle-based digital marketing agency. Prior to the start of the first season, Predmore stated, "Ultimately, my goal is to build the best women's club in the world. That won't happen tomorrow or this year, but in 10 years or 20 years that's where we want to be." Predmore's wife, Teresa, played college soccer at Oregon State University and soccer is one of her lifelong passions.

Leading up to the inaugural season of the NWSL, Amy Carnell was named general manager for the team. Within a week of regular season play, Carnell resigned from her position citing "personal reasons" and head coach Laura Harvey assumed the role – a setup similar to what she was used to as coach of the Arsenal L.F.C. in England.

Following the 2017 season, Laura Harvey resigned as general manager and head coach of the team, and Vlatko Andonovski was hired from FC Kansas City as the new head coach. Andonovski and Harvey had been the two most successful coaches in NWSL history, with three Coach of the Year awards and four trophies between them, and Andonovski was the only replacement Harvey endorsed. Andonovski further complimented Harvey's positive impacts and committed to continue playing a "beautiful game" with the Reign.

Before the 2018 season, the team announced an agreement with Force 10 Sports Management, LLC, for it to manage ticket sales and services. Force 10 Sports Management owns and operates the Seattle Storm, a standalone professional women's basketball team in the WNBA, much like the Reign.

On January 30, 2019, the Reign announced that it would move to Tacoma, Washington. As part of the move, the team announced two new minority owners: the Baseball Club of Tacoma LLC (the owner and operator of the Tacoma Rainiers, led by Mikal Thomsen), as well as Seattle Sounders FC majority owner Adrian Hanauer and his mother Lenore Hanauer. Bill and Teresa Predmore remained the team's majority owners, and Bill the team president, after the additional investments. The relocation also brought previous management agreement with Force 10 Sports Management to an end, with the Tacoma Rainiers taking over similar responsibilities at Cheney Stadium.

After winning the 2019 NWSL Coach of the Year award, head coach Vlatko Andonovski resigned to manage the United States women's national soccer team on October 28, 2019. As his departure had been anticipated, co-owner and president Bill Predmore had already begun the search for Andonovski's successor since early September.

On November 25, 2019, majority owner Bill Predmore announced his entry into exclusive negotiations to sell the team to OL Groupe, the parent company of French clubs Olympique Lyonnais and Olympique Lyonnais Féminin. Jean-Michel Aulas, president of OL Groupe, had been public about his desire to acquire an NWSL team as part of Lyon's international ambitions. After the sale was completed, previous majority owners Bill and Teresa Predmore retained a minority stake in the team, while previous minority owners Adrian Hanauer and Tacoma Soccer Ventures no longer had ownership positions. On December 19, 2019, the team announced that the parties entered into a definitive agreement for the sale to be completed in January 2020. The team's total assets were valued at $3.51 million, and OL Groupe would pay $3.145 million to acquire an 89.5 percent ownership stake in the team. It was also announced on the same day that French basketball legend Tony Parker, a business partner of OL Groupe, would also pay to acquire a 3% ownership stake, that Aulas would become chairman of the team's board of directors, and that a chief operating officer would be appointed to support the CEO Bill Predmore. OL Groupe executive Vincent Berthillot was later appointed as the COO.

On January 17, 2020, French coach Farid Benstiti was announced as the third head coach in team history. This was followed by the announcement that the team would rebrand as "OL Reign" as part of the takeover. Gérard Houllier was appointed the team's technical director in November 2020, but he died a month later. Benstiti resigned on July 2, 2021. On July 15, 2021, the team announced that Laura Harvey would return as head coach after the Tokyo Olympics.

On September 30, 2021, CEO Bill Predmore confirmed that he asked for former head coach Farid Benstiti's resignation after a player reported inappropriate comments made by Benstiti. Despite a formal complaint being made to the NWSL, Predmore did not disclose details behind Benstiti's resignation at the time. Benstiti was initially hired despite allegations of similar behavior in the past, and Predmore's withholding of information continues a pattern of institutional failure in the NWSL where coaches and personnel under investigation for misconduct were allowed to leave quietly and take up other positions where they could still do harm.

In February 2022, club founders Bill and Teresa Predmore announced that they would step down from their operational roles as club CEO and president of the club's youth academy, respectively, while remaining as the club's minority owners. Former COO Vincent Berthillot succeeded Bill Predmore as the club's CEO, while a general manager dedicated to soccer operations would be appointed. Later that month, the club announced Nick Perera, captain of the United States men's national beach soccer team, as the new general manager after serving as executive director of Washington Youth Soccer.

Ownership history

Executive history

Players and staff

Squad

Staff

Captains

Head coaches

Honors 

NWSL Championship
 Runners-up (2): 2014, 2015
NWSL Shield
 Winners (3): 2014, 2015, 2022
The Women's Cup
 Winners (1): 2022

Records

Season records

Player records 

 Current players in bold. Statistics are updated once a year after the conclusion of the NWSL season.

Most appearances

Top scorers

See also 
 History of professional soccer in Seattle
 List of top-division football clubs in CONCACAF countries
 List of professional sports teams in the United States and Canada

Notes

References

External links 

 

 
National Women's Soccer League teams
Women's soccer clubs in the United States
2012 establishments in Washington (state)
Association football clubs established in 2012
Sports in Tacoma, Washington
Women's sports in Washington (state)
2020 mergers and acquisitions